Rozzano Locsin is a Filipino American Professor of Nursing at Tokushima University (Japan), a Professor Emeritus of Florida Atlantic University (United States), and a Visiting Professor at universities in Thailand, Uganda, and the Philippines.

Locsin authored Technological Competency as Caring in Nursing: A Model for Practice,  He edited and co-authored three more books, including A Contemporary Nursing Practice: The  Weight of Knowing in Nursing.

Career 
Locsin was born in 1954 in the Philippines. A registered nurse, he is a native of Dumaguete.

Locsin earned his Bachelor of Science in Nursing from Silliman University in 1976 and his MA in Nursing in 1978.  He received his PhD in Nursing from the University of the Philippines in 1988.

In 1991, Locsin joined the Florida Atlantic University, Christine E. Lynn College of Nursing, where he became a tenured Professor of Nursing.  He is now a Professor Emeritus Locsin currents resides in Japan and serves as a professor of nursing at Tokushima University.

Academic career 
Through the Fulbright Scholar Award, Locsin developed the first masters program in nursing in Uganda while researching the phenomenon "waiting-to-know" and the lived experiences of persons exposed to patients who died of Ebola. With Mbarara University and the Fulbright Alumni Initiative Award, he established the first community-based University Nursing Education Program.

As a Fulbright Senior Specialist in Global and Public Health, Locsin led collaborative research studies advancing the development of models of nursing practice in Uganda, Thailand, and the Philippines. He maintains visiting and honorary professorial appointments in nursing in these countries.

Awards 

 2003 - Edith Moore Copeland Excellence in Creativity Award from Sigma Theta Tau International Honor Society of Nursing 
 2006 -inducted as Fellow of the American Academy of Nursing (FAAN).
 2007 - first recipient of the Lillian O. Slemp Endowed Chair in Nursing at the University of Texas-Pan American in Edinburg, Texas
 August 2009 -  inaugural recipient of the John F. Wymer, Jr. Distinguished Professor in Nursing at Florida Atlantic University. 
 Julita V. Sotejo Medallion of Honor from the University of the Philippines College of Nursing Alumni Association International in Los Angeles, California.
 Outstanding Sillimanian Award - Silliman University
 Outstanding Paulinian Award - St. Paul University Quezon City

Books and chapters 

 In 2001, Locsin edited the book Advancing Technology, Caring, and Nursing, published by Auburn House, Connecticut, USA. 
 In 2005, Locsin's book Technological Competency as Caring in Nursing was published by Sigma Theta Tau International Press (a 2017 revised version was published by Silliman University Press, Dumaguete, Philippines). It was translated into Japanese in 2009.
 In 2007 Locsin co-edited the book Technology and Nursing: Practice, Concepts, and Issues, released by Palgrave-Macmillan Co., London, UK,
 In 2009, with Dr. Marguerite Purnell as co-editor, published, A Contemporary Nursing Process: The  Weight of Knowing in Nursing by Springer Publishing Co.
 Locsin, R. (2016) Technological Competency as Caring in Nursing: A Model for Practice (rev ed). Silliman University Press, Dumaguete, Philippines.
 Locsin, R. (2015). Rozzano Locsin's Technological Competency as Caring in Nursing: Knowing as Process and Technological Knowing as Practice.In Smith, M., & Parker, M. (eds). Nursing Theories and Nursing Practice (4th ed), New York, F.A. Davis, Co. (p, 451–462).
 Locsin, R. Barnard, A., and Locsin, R. (2007) Technology and Nursing Practice. Palgrave Macmillan Co., Ltd. UK.
 Locsin, R. and Kongsuwan, W. (2017).  The Evolution of the Theory of Technological Competency as Caring in Nursing. Chanmuang Press, Thailand. (Anticipated distribution: July 2017)
 Tanioka, T., Yasuhara, Y., Osaka, K., Ito, Hirokazu and Locsin, R. (2017). Nursing Robots: Robotic Technology and Human Caring for the Elderly (eds). Fukuro Publishing, Japan. (Anticipated distribution: May, 2017)

Technological Competency as Caring in Nursing: A Model for Practice 
Locsin's middle range nursing theory  is an interesting discussion of the correlation between hands-on patient care and the use of technology. Technology is defined as anything that makes things efficient – from basic diagnostic technologies to therapeutic practices familiar to all nurses. Specifically, he discusses the importance of understanding the need for knowing “high-tech” instruments, e.g. monitors, implants, and devices, that are a part of patient care, as these will provide opportunities for the nurse to know the patient fully as person.

Locsin's work is obviously guided by the question asked by thoughtful nurses everywhere: How can I satisfactorily reconcile the idea of competent use of technology with the idea of caring in nursing? His theory significantly describes a practical understanding of the solution enriching the practice value of all of the general theories of nursing which are grounded in caring. Technological competency as caring in nursing informs nursing as a critical process of knowing persons’ wholeness. Locsin's theory book explores, clarifies, and advances the conception of technological competency as caring in nursing. His theory is essential to modeling a practice of nursing from the perspective of caring. It is a practical illumination of excellent nursing in a technological world.

References 

Filipino nurses
1954 births
Living people
Filipino expatriates in Japan
People from Dumaguete
Florida Atlantic University faculty
University of the Philippines alumni
Silliman University alumni